South Las Colinas station is a planned DART Light Rail station in the Las Colinas development of Irving, Texas. The station is planned but deferred until surrounding development warrants construction. The station site is also adjacent to a potential commuter rail line and could serve as a future terminus of the Las Colinas APT.

References

External links 
Dallas Area Rapid Transit

Dallas Area Rapid Transit light rail stations
Proposed railway stations in the United States